St. Joseph's Convent High School, Patna, is a private, girls high school in Bankipur neighborhood of Patna, Bihar, India. It is a Catholic Missionary educational institution established in 1853, currently managed by Sisters of Congregation of Jesus. It has two sections, one is affiliated to the Council for the Indian School Certificate Examinations, New Delhi and another is affiliated to Bihar School Examination Board. It is one of the oldest schools in the state of Bihar and was founded by the first Bishop of Patna, Anastasius Hartmann. The current principal of the school is Sr. Josephine CJ. The school's guiding principle are the teachings of Mary Ward.

History

In 1849, Bishop Anastasius Hartmann, who was responsible for the Patna-Bettiah section of the North India Mission, acquired a sizable piece of land (about five acres) in Bankipore where he laid the foundation of a chapel on September 23, 1849. The Roman Catholic Church, St. Joseph's, was opened in 1850.

In 1852, on invitation of Bishop Anastasius Hartmann, the Apostolic Vicar of Patna, a group of five Institute of the Blessed Virgin Mary Sisters from Munich Province in Germany came to India. These five sisters were Sisters Maria Groeppner, Angela Hoffman, Aloysia Maher, Antonia Feth and Catherine Schreibman. The sisters landed in Bombay by ship and then set out for Patna. They traveled from Bombay to Patna by bullock cart through the thick jungles. They left Bombay in early September 1852 and reached Patna around February 1853. They established the first IBVM House in Bankipore in 1853, on the bank of River Ganges. The house and school bear the name of Saint Joseph. Bankipore, as the first foundation, was considered the mother house of the Institute in India. St. Joseph's was the only convent between Calcutta and Agra at that time.

Initially, in addition to the boarding and day school, there were two orphanages on the school campus. One for native girls and another for European and Eurasian girls. More buildings were added and the institution gradually grew over time. A Hindi section was founded in 1950. Currently the school is affiliated to ICSE as well as Bihar State Board. It has a 100% pass percentage in ICSE examination board results for many years and also produced several state and city toppers.

Campus and infrastructure

The school is situated at Ashok Rajpath road, on the banks of river Ganges in Bankipur neighborhood of Patna.

The central building complex houses classrooms, administrative offices and an auditorium. The auditorium is well equipped with PA System and has a stage for plays and performances. The auditorium is also used for annual gatherings and debate competitions.

The School has well equipped laboratories for course related practical work. There are four laboratories within the School - Physics, Chemistry, Biology and Computer. The school has Basketball Court and also includes Martial Arts for girls in its curriculum. The library is well equipped with reference books and caters to students of all grades. The school also offers private, city-wide transportation services for students and faculty through private bus service company.

Academic

Affiliation

The school is affiliated to the Council for the Indian School Certificate Examinations, New Delhi. There is another Hindi section of the school which is affiliated with the Bihar School Examination Board. The school prepares the students for Indian Certificate of Secondary Education and the Indian School Certificate examinations for Class X and Class XII respectively.

Subjects

Below subjects are taught in the school for classes as per the ICSE curriculum.
  English
  Hindi/ Second Language - Indian Languages
  Sanskrit
  Mathematics
  Science (Physics, Chemistry, Biology)
  Value Education/Moral Science
  History, Geography, Civics
  Computer Studies/Science/Applications
  Economics/Economic Applications
  Commerce/Commercial Studies/Applications
  Business Studies
  Environmental Science
  SUPW and Community Service

Medium of instruction

School follows English medium of instruction for its ICSE affiliated section. Another Hindi section affiliated with the Bihar Board uses Hindi as medium of instruction to teach students.

School session

The school year is from April to March. Days are divided into nine -periods with summer and winter timings. The order in which the classes meet varies from day to day.

Uniform

Girls

During Warm Season:
Navy Blue colored pleated and divided skirt (knee length), white shirt (half sleeve) with school monogram, black shoes and white socks. Hair ribbons must be navy blue colored.
During Cold Season:
White shirt (full sleeve), Navy Blue colored pleated and divided skirt (knee length), slacks, Navy Blue colored V-Neck sweaters (half sleeve), Navy Blue colored blazer with school monogram and school tie.

On the days of Physical Training:
White divided skirt (knee length), white shirt(half sleeves), white shoes and white socks

Motto and houses
 
The four school houses are:
  Ruby (Motto: On Wings of Loyalty) 
  Topaz (Motto: Effort spells Success)
  Emerald (Motto: Truth alone Triumphs)
  Sapphire (Motto: Unity is Strength)

Student groups

Student council
The Student Council is a body of student representatives, headed by the Head Girl. It is made up of the captains of the teams and representatives from other co-curricular activities along with elected and nominated students of each class from grade VI through X. Parliamentary procedure is used at meetings and the main purpose of this group is to assist the Principal, Vice-Principal, staff, and students in fulfilling their responsibilities. The student members help maintain order in the school during the Assembly and breaks, in between classes, and also on important occasions like the Annual Day.

Tarumitra

Tarumitra is a student forum promoting ecological sensitivity.

LTS
L.T.S stands for Leadership Training for Service is a social movement. Its motto is “For God and country – let your light shine”. St. Joseph's Convent High School Patna was the first school in Patna to start this movement in the year 1974 with Sr. Genevieve as its guide. LTS promoter Fr. With S.J was invited to give an orientation to class X. Since 1994 it has been working under the guidance of Mrs. Shubhra Roy. The children are motivated and inspired to develop social awareness, love for humanity, social service, self-sacrifice, simplicity, truthfulness and purity at heart.

Notable alumni

Papiya Ghosh
Nidhi Yasha
Karishma Sharma

See also
 List of schools in India
 List of schools in Patna
 St. Xavier's High School, Patna
 St. Michael's High School, Patna
 Notre Dame Academy, Patna

External links

References

Schools in Patna
Christian schools in Bihar
High schools and secondary schools in Bihar
Educational institutions established in 1853
1853 establishments in India